Jeanne Elizabeth Wilson (February 18, 1926 – April 18, 2018) was an American competition swimmer who represented the United States at the 1948 Summer Olympics in London.  She competed in the preliminary heats of the 200-meter breaststroke, recording a time of 3:18.3.

In June 1949, Wilson married Jack Vaughn and changed her last name to Vaughan.

References

1926 births
2018 deaths
American female breaststroke swimmers
Olympic swimmers of the United States
Swimmers from Chicago
Swimmers at the 1948 Summer Olympics
21st-century American women